HMS Kestrel was a Clydebank-built three funnelled 30-knot destroyer ordered by the Royal Navy under the 1895 – 1896 Naval Estimates.  She was the fourth ship to carry this name since it was first used in 1846 for a brigantine.

In 1913 she was grouped with similar vessels as a C-class destroyer.

Construction
Kestrel was ordered from J & G Thomson under the 1896–1897 construction programme for the Royal Navy, one of seventeen thirty-knot destroyers ordered from eight shipbuilders under the programme.

Displacement was  light and  full load.

Armament was specified as a single QF 12 pounder 12 cwt ( calibre) gun on a platform on the ship's conning tower (in practice the platform was also used as the ship's bridge), backed up by five 6-pounder guns, and two 18-inch (450 mm) torpedo tubes.

The ship was laid down as Yard Number 298 on 2 September 1896 at Thomson's shipyard in Clydebank and launched on 25 March 1898. The revised design was successful and Kestrel met the required speed during sea trials.  In 1899 during the construction of these ships, steelmaker John Brown and Company of Sheffield bought J & G Thomson's Clydebank yard.  She was completed and accepted by the Royal Navy in April 1900, before the four ships ordered under the 1895–1896 programme.

Pre-War
After commissioning she was assigned to the Chatham Division of the Harwich Flotilla.  She was deployed in Home waters for her entire service life.

In July 1900, Kestrel took part in the annual Naval Manoeuvres. Kestrel was based at Portsmouth in 1901, and took part in the annual Naval Manoeuvres in July–August that year.

On 7 August 1907 Kestrel and the River-class destroyer  collided off Swanage, with Kestrels bow being cut off in the collision. Kestrel was brought into Portsmouth Dockyard for repair, where, such was the number of Royal Navy ships requiring repair after recent incidents, only one dock was available to receive Kestrel, and which was only able to accommodate the damaged destroyer because she had lost her bow, as Kestrel was otherwise too long to fit in the dock. Kestrel was part of the 5th Destroyer Flotilla based at Devonport in 1910. In November 1910 she was ordered to Gibraltar for a refit, leaving Devonport at the end of the month in the company of the battleship . On reaching Gibraltar, her crew transferred to the destroyer , which had just completed a refit, for the voyage back to home waters.

On 30 August 1912 the Admiralty directed all destroyer classes were to be designated by letters. The class letters were painted on the hull below the bridge area and on a funnel.

In February 1913 Kestrel was based at Sheerness as a tender to the "Stone frigate" (or shore establishment) HMS Actaeon, which acted as a torpedo training school. Kestrel was listed as in commission with a nucleus crew.

World War I
Kestrel remained based at Sheerness as a tender to Actaeon in July 1914.  With the outbreak of hostilities in August 1914 she was assigned to the Nore Local Flotilla.  Her duties included anti-submarine and counter mining patrols in the Thames Estuary.

In 1919 she was paid off and laid-up in reserve awaiting disposal.   She was sold on 17 March 1921 to Thos. W. Ward of Sheffield for breaking at Rainham, Kent on the Thames Estuary.

Pennant Numbers

Notes

Citations

Bibliography

External links
 http://www.pbenyon.plus.com/18-1900/I/02585.html

 

Ships built on the River Clyde
1898 ships
C-class destroyers (1913)
World War I destroyers of the United Kingdom